Carl T. Langford (July 23, 1918 – July 9, 2011) was the Mayor of Orlando, Florida from 1967 to 1980. Served in the United States Army from 1941 until 1946 with the rank of Mayor. He was also one of the first two Eagle Scouts in the state to be awarded the Distinguished Eagle Scout Award. Returning to Florida after his military service, Carl attended the University of Florida and graduated Magna Cum Laude in 1948.

Langford died July 9, 2011, at age 92. He was interred at Greenwood Cemetery.
 Sigma Alpha Epsilon University of Florida 1936 -1948.

References

1918 births
2011 deaths
Mayors of Orlando, Florida
People from Orlando, Florida
United States Army personnel of World War II
United States Army officers
University of Florida alumni